"Laid So Low (Tears Roll Down)" is a song by British band Tears for Fears. It was released as a single in 1992 to coincide with the release of the band's greatest hits album Tears Roll Down (Greatest Hits 82–92). 

As Curt Smith had already departed the band by this time, "Laid So Low" was effectively the first release of the Roland Orzabal "solo" era of Tears For Fears which would span most of the 1990s. The song was a top 20 hit in the UK, France, Italy and Poland; a top 40 hit in Canada, Germany and the Netherlands; and reached the top 10 on the US Modern Rock Tracks chart.

An earlier, mainly instrumental version of the song appeared as the B-side to the 1989 single "Sowing the Seeds of Love" where it was simply titled "Tears Roll Down". An animated video to this earlier version was included on the 1990 video collection Sowing the Seeds.

After Tears Roll Down (Greatest Hits 82-92) went out of print, "Laid So Low" has never been reissued in any physical or digital format.

Track listings
12" / CD single
"Laid So Low (Tears Roll Down)" – 4:44
"The Body Wah" (Roland Orzabal, Alan Griffiths) – 5:21
"Lord of Karma" (Roland Orzabal, Alan Griffiths) – 4:45

7" single
"Laid So Low (Tears Roll Down)"
"The Body Wah" (Roland Orzabal, Alan Griffiths)

Charts

References

1992 singles
1992 songs
Fontana Records singles
Songs written by Roland Orzabal
Tears for Fears songs